Stefan Janković (born 11 November 1997) is a Serbian professional footballer who plays as a midfielder for Maltese club Żebbuġ Rangers.

Club career

OFK Beograd
Janković initially played in Partizan's youth system, but ultimately joined OFK Beograd along with former Partizan teammates Dejan Dražić, Milan Savić, Nemanja Belaković, and Nikola Aksentijević. On 25 May 2014, he made his professional debut with OFK Beograd under coach Zlatko Krmpotić in a 4–2 loss against Red Star Belgrade. On 11 January 2019, Janković returned to OFK Beograd after two years.

Central Coast Mariners
Stefan signed with Australian A-League side Central Coast Mariners in December 2020. His first and only competitive appearance for the Mariners came as a late substitute in a 3–2 win over Melbourne City in the 2020–21 A-League on 3 February 2021.

Pembroke Athleta
In September 2021, Janković signed for Maltese Challenge League side Pembroke Athleta. He made his debut for the side in their opening game of the 2021–22 Maltese Challenge League against Vittoriosa Stars. He scored his first goal for the side in their next league game, a win over Melita.

References

External links
 
 Stefan Janković Stats at utakmica.rs

1997 births
Living people
Sportspeople from Leskovac
Association football midfielders
Serbian footballers
Serbia youth international footballers
OFK Beograd players
FK BSK Borča players
FK Borac Čačak players
Central Coast Mariners FC players
Pembroke Athleta F.C. players
Żebbuġ Rangers F.C. players
Serbian SuperLiga players
A-League Men players
Maltese Challenge League players
Maltese Premier League players